The Archives Africaines of the Belgian Federal Public Service Foreign Affairs in Brussels contains records related to colonial Congo Free State, Belgian Congo and Ruanda-Urundi, 1885-1962. The archives was transferred in 1960 to the Ministère belge des Affaires étrangères. In 2015 the archives went to the Belgian State Archives, an arrangement expected to continue until 2018. The Archives Africaines includes "the archives of the former Ministry for Colonies (5 km), the archives of the Governor-General of the Congo (4.5 km), and the files on former colonial personnel (1.4 km)."

Archives

Records prior to 1906 remain scarce. "As early as 1888 Leopold II created an archival service for his Congo Free State that operated as part of the Departement de l'Interieur at Brussels. The king established the archives as his personal property, however; and in 1906 the major part of the administrative records of the Congo Free State were systematically destroyed."

As of 2015 the extant records are organized by originating office ("fonds").

Fonds Ministère des Colonies
The following is a list of groups of records within the larger set of records from the Ministère des Colonies.

 3e DG - Travaux Publics
 Actes officiels
 Affaires Étrangères
 Affaires Indigènes et Main-d'OEuvre
 Agriculture
 Bibliothèque
 Bien-Être Indigène
 Brevets
 Cadastre
 Service cartographique (maps)
 Colonat
 Colonisation et Crédit au colonat
 Cabinets ministériels
 Conseil Colonial
 Conseil Supérieur
 Contrôle financier
 Direction Générale des Services Administratifs 
 Distinctions honorifiques
 Douanes
 École coloniale
 Enseignement
 Finances
 Force Publique (militarized police)
 Hygiène
 Institut Royal Colonial Belge
 Impôts des Sociétés
 Inspecteur Général du Service Juridique
 Jardin Colonial
 Justice
 Justice - Successions
 Justice - Kimbanguisme
 Mines
 Missions
 Office des Cités Africaines
 Office Colonial 
 Personnalités civiles
 Plan décennal
 Postes, Télégraphes et Téléphones
 Presse
 Rapports Annuels du Congo belge
 Rapports Annuels du Rwanda-Urundi
 Régime foncier
 Service social
 Statuts des sociétés administratives
 Sûreté
 Terres
 
 Privés

Fonds Gouvernement Général de Léopoldville
These records arrived in Belgium in 1960. The following is a list of groups of records within the larger set of records from the Gouvernement Général de Léopoldville.

 Gouvernement Général de Léopoldville
 Association des Fonctionnaires et des Agents coloniaux (association of colonial officials)
 Affaires Indigènes et Main-d'OEuvre (indigenous affairs and labour)
 Bulletins d'Inscription
 Cabinet du Gouverneur Général (office of the governor general)
 Enseignement et Travail (labour training)
 Gouvernement Général de Léopoldville - Justice
 Missions et Enseignement
 Mobilisation Civile
 Service du Personnel d'Afrique
 Service du Personnel Indigène
 Successions
 Sûreté (security)

Fonds Ruanda-Urundi
The records in this group arrived in Belgium in 1961.
 Ruanda-Urundi
 Ruanda
 Burundi

Staff
Archivists of the Archives Africaines have included Claudine Dekais (circa 1996). Madeleine van Grieken-Taverniers was archivist of the Ministere des Colonies, circa 1955-1958.

See also
 Minister of the Colonies (Belgium)
 Bibliothèque Africaine, part of the Bibliothèque des Affaires Etrangères, overseen by FPS Foreign Affairs
 Belgian National Archives 2 - Joseph Cuvelier repository, which includes material related to Belgian Congo, etc.
 Belgian Royal Museum for Central Africa, which includes archives

References

This article incorporates information from the Dutch Wikipedia and French Wikipedia.

Bibliography

in English
 
 
 

in other languages
  (part 2 in v.22, no.1, 1951)
  
   (Includes bibliography)

External links
 

Archives in Belgium
Belgian Congo
Ruanda-Urundi
Federal departments and agencies of Belgium